Kalyanagiri is a suburb of Mysore city in Karnataka state of India.

Location
Kalyanagiri is located on the eastern side of Mysore city.

Demographics
Kalyanagiri is a predominantly Muslim area with many mosques and madhrassas around.  The Hindu population is also sizeable.

See also
 Mysore East

References

Suburbs of Mysore